The 1901 Marshall Thundering Herd football team represented Marshall University in the 1901 college football season. The team did not have a coach, and outscored their opponents 25–0 in three games.

The 1900 season marked the third undefeated season in a row for Marshall, as well as the third consecutive season without allowing a point.

Schedule

References

Marshall
Marshall Thundering Herd football seasons
College football undefeated seasons
Marshall Thundering Herd football